The 2013 Montreal Impact season was the club's second season Major League Soccer, the top flight of both American and Canadian soccer.

For the 2013 season, outside of MLS, the Impact will compete in the 2013 Canadian Championship, Canada's domestic cup competition, which determines the Canadian entrant in the CONCACAF Champions League.

Background

Review 

The team started the season with Marco Schällibaum as new coach. After finishing 12th overall in the previous MLS season and second best Canadian team in MLS in 2012, the Montreal Impact officially started their 2013 season on Monday January 21, 2013 with a pre-season training sessions at Marie-Victorin Sports Complex in Montréal-Nord. The squad's first official pre-season friendly took place on February 9, 2013, at the annual Walt Disney World Pro Soccer Classic tournament with a 2–1 victory over Sporting Kansas City. The team kicked off the season on March 2, 2013, with a 0–1 away victory over Seattle Sounders FC.

They started the season very well with four straight victories, including their first two on the road, equaling their road wins total of last year of two.

Competitions

Pre-season matches

Walt Disney World Pro Soccer Classic

Other pre-season matches

MLS regular season

Table 
Eastern Conference Table

Overall Table

Results summary

Results by round

Match results

Playoffs

Canadian championship 

 Each round is a two-game aggregate goal series with the away goals rule.

CONCACAF Champions League

The Montreal Impact will compete in the 2013–14 CONCACAF Champions League as a result of winning the 2013 Canadian Championship. The draw for the Group Stage was held on June 3, 2013.

MLS reserves

The Montreal Impact will compete in the Eastern Division for the 2013 MLS Reserves season. This is the first year of the partnership between Major League Soccer and the USL Pro. As a result, Montreal will play the Rochester Rhinos twice and the results will count towards each teams respective tables. The division consists of seven teams, including Columbus Crew, Chicago Fire Soccer Club, FC Dallas, Houston Dynamo, New York Red Bulls, Rochester Rhinos and Toronto FC.

Match results

Player information

Squad information

Player transactions

In

Out

Loans In

Loans Out

Starting 11

4–1–4–1 formation

International Caps
Players called for senior international duty during the 2013 season while under contract with the Montreal Impact.

*Montreal Impact Academy player.

Management

 Sporting director —  Nick De Santis
 Director of Soccer operations —  Matt Jordan
 Director, Montreal Impact Academy —  Philippe Eullaffroy
 Head coach —  Marco Schällibaum
 Assistant coach —  Mauro Biello
 Assistant coach —  Philippe Eullaffroy 
 Goalkeeping coach —  Youssef Dahha
 Physical Preparation Coach —  Paolo Pacione
 Team Manager —  Adam Braz
 Team Administrator —  Daniel Pozzi
 Equipment Coordinator —  Remy Eyckerman
 Equipment Manager —  Aldo Ricciuti
 Players Service —  Bradley Adam Smith

Statistics

Appearances and goals

|-
! colspan="14" style="background:#dcdcdc; text-align:center"| Goalkeeper

|-
! colspan="14" style="background:#dcdcdc; text-align:center"| Defenders

|-
! colspan="14" style="background:#dcdcdc; text-align:center"| Midfielders

|-
! colspan="14" style="background:#dcdcdc; text-align:center"| Forwards

|-
! colspan="14" style="background:#dcdcdc; text-align:center"|Players who left the club during the season: (Statistics shown are the appearances made and goals scored while at Montreal Impact)

|}
Last updated: November 1, 2013
Source: Montreal Impact
Italic: denotes player is no longer with team

Goalkeeper stats
{| border="1" cellpadding="4" cellspacing="0" style="margin: 1em 1em 1em 1em 0; background: #f9f9f9; border: 1px #aaa solid; border-collapse: collapse; font-size: 95%; text-align: center;"
|-
| rowspan="2" style="width:1%; text-align:center;"|No.
| rowspan="2" style="width:70px; text-align:center;"|Nat.
| rowspan="2" style="width:44%; text-align:center;"|Player
| colspan="3" style="text-align:center;"|Total
| colspan="3" style="text-align:center;"|Major League Soccer
| colspan="3" style="text-align:center;"|Canadian Championship
| colspan="3" style="text-align:center;"|CONCACAF Champions League
| colspan="3" style="text-align:center;"|MLS Cup Playoffs
|-
|MIN
|GA
|GAA
|MIN
|GA
|GAA
|MIN
|GA
|GAA
|MIN
|GA
|GAA
|MIN
|GA
|GAA
|-
| style="text-align: right;" |1
|
| style="text-align: left;" |Troy Perkins
|3060
|51
|1.50
|2970
|48
|1.45
|0
|0
|0.00
|0
|0
|0.00
|90
|3
|3.00
|-
| style="text-align: right;" |30
|
| style="text-align: left;" |Evan Bush
|810
|9
|1.00
|90
|1
|1.00
|360
|4
|1.00
|360
|4
|1.00
|0
|0
|0.00
|-
| style="text-align: right;" |40
|
| style="text-align: left;" |Maxime Crépeau
|0
|0
|0.00
|0
|0
|0.00
|0
|0
|0.00
|0
|0
|0.00
|0
|0
|0.00

Top scorers

{| class="wikitable sortable alternance"  style="font-size:85%; text-align:center; line-height:14px; width:60%;"
|-
!width=10|No.
!width=10|Nat.
! scope="col" style="width:275px;"|Player
!width=10|Pos.
!width=80|Major League Soccer
!width=80|Canadian Championship
!width=80|CONCACAF Champions League
!width=80|MLS Cup Playoffs
!width=80|TOTAL
|-
|9||  || Marco Di Vaio                    || FW || 20 || 2 ||  ||  || 22
|-
|7||  || Felipe || MF || 5 || 1 ||  ||  || 6
|-
|6||  || Hassoun Camara                   || DF || 3 || 1 || 1 ||  || 5
|-
|8||  || Patrice Bernier                  || MF || 4 ||  ||  ||  || 4
|-
|35||  || Daniele Paponi                  || FW || 2 || 1 || 1 ||  || 4
|-
|15||  || Andrés Romero   || FW || 2 || 1 ||  ||  || 3
|-
|21||  || Justin Mapp                     || MF || 2 || 1 ||  ||  || 3
|-
|33||  || Andrew Wenger                   || FW || 1 || 1 || 1 ||  || 3
|-
|5||  || Jeb Brovsky                      || DF || 2 ||  ||  ||  || 2
|-
|19||  || Blake Smith                     || MF || 2 ||  ||  ||  || 2
|-
|11||  || Sanna Nyassi                    || MF || 1 ||  ||  ||  || 1
|-
|13||  || Matteo Ferrari                  || DF || 1 ||  ||  ||  || 1
|-
|18||  || Collen Warner                   || MF || 1 ||  ||  ||  || 1
|-
|22||  || Davy Arnaud                     || MF || 1 ||  ||  ||  || 1
|-
|31||  || Andrea Pisanu                   || MF || 1 ||  ||  ||  || 1
|-
|34||  || Karl Ouimette                   || DF || 1 ||  ||  ||  || 1
|-
|51||  || Maxim Tissot                    || DF || 1 ||  ||  ||  || 1
|- class="sortbottom"
| colspan="4"|Totals|| 50 || 8 || 3 || 0 ||61

Top assists

{| class="wikitable sortable alternance"  style="font-size:85%; text-align:center; line-height:14px; width:60%;"
|-
!width=10|No.
!width=10|Nat.
! scope="col" style="width:275px;"|Player
!width=10|Pos.
!width=80|Major League Soccer
!width=80|Canadian Championship
!width=80|CONCACAF Champions League
!width=80|MLS Cup Playoffs
!width=80|TOTAL
|-
|21||  || Justin Mapp                     || MF || 8 || 2 ||  ||  || 10
|-
|7||  || Felipe || MF || 8 ||  ||  ||  || 8
|-
|8||  || Patrice Bernier                  || MF || 8 ||  ||  ||  || 8
|-
|22||  || Davy Arnaud                     || MF || 5 ||  ||  ||  || 5
|-
|9||  || Marco Di Vaio                    || FW || 2 || 2 ||  ||  || 4
|-
|6||  || Hassoun Camara                   || DF || 3 ||  ||  ||  || 3
|-
|33||  || Andrew Wenger                   || FW || 3 ||  ||  ||  || 3
|-
|5||  || Jeb Brovsky                      || DF || 2 ||  ||  ||  || 2
|-
|15||  || Andrés Romero   || FW || 2 ||  ||  ||  || 2
|-
|51||  || Maxim Tissot                    || DF || 1 ||  || 1 ||  || 2
|-
|11||  || Sanna Nyassi                    || MF || 1 ||  ||  ||  || 1
|-
|13||  || Matteo Ferrari                  || DF || 1 ||  ||  ||  || 1
|-
|14||  || Alessandro Nesta                || DF || 1 ||  ||  ||  || 1
|-
|19||  || Blake Smith                     || MF || 1 ||  ||  ||  || 1
|-
|23||  || |Hernán Bernardello             || MF ||  ||  || 1 ||  || 1
|-
|31||  || Andrea Pisanu                   || MF || 1 ||  ||  ||  || 1
|-
|35||  || Daniele Paponi                  || FW || 1 ||  ||  ||  || 1
|-
|55||  || |Wandrille Lefèvre              || DF || 1 ||  ||  ||  || 1
|-
|- class="sortbottom"
| colspan="4"|Totals|| 49 || 4 || 2 || 0 ||55

Clean sheets

{| class="wikitable sortable alternance"  style="font-size:85%; text-align:center; line-height:14px; width:60%;"
|-
!width=10|No.
!width=10|Nat.
! scope="col" style="width:275px;"|Player
!width=80|Major League Soccer
!width=80|Canadian Championship
!width=80|CONCACAF Champions League
!width=80|MLS Cup Playoffs
!width=80|TOTAL
|-
|1||  || Troy Perkins                     || 8 ||  ||  ||  || 8
|-
|30||  || Evan Bush                       ||  || 2 || 2 ||  || 4
|- class="sortbottom"
| colspan="3"|Totals|| 8 || 2 || 2 || 0 ||12

Penalties saved

{| class="wikitable sortable alternance"  style="font-size:85%; text-align:center; line-height:14px; width:60%;"
|-
!width=10|No.
!width=10|Nat.
! scope="col" style="width:275px;"|Player
!width=80|Major League Soccer
!width=80|Canadian Championship
!width=80|CONCACAF Champions League
!width=80|MLS Cup Playoffs
!width=80|TOTAL
|-
|1||  || Troy Perkins                     || 2 ||  ||  ||  || 2
|-
|30||  || Evan Bush                       ||  ||  || 2 ||  || 2
|- class="sortbottom"
| colspan="3"|Totals|| 2 || 0 || 2 || 0 ||4

Own goals

{| class="wikitable sortable alternance"  style="font-size:85%; text-align:center; line-height:14px; width:60%;"
|-
!width=10|No.
!width=10|Nat.
! scope="col" style="width:275px;"|Player
!width=10|Pos.
!width=80|Major League Soccer
!width=80|Canadian Championship
!width=80|CONCACAF Champions League
!width=80|MLS Cup Playoffs
!width=80|TOTAL
|-
|13||  || Matteo Ferrari                  || DF || 1 ||  ||  ||  || 1
|- class="sortbottom"
| colspan="4"|Totals|| 1 || 0 || 0 || 0 ||1

Top minutes played

{| class="wikitable sortable alternance"  style="font-size:85%; text-align:center; line-height:14px; width:60%;"
|-
!width=10|No.
!width=10|Nat.
! scope="col" style="width:275px;"|Player
!width=10|Pos.
!width=80|Major League Soccer
!width=80|Canadian Championship
!width=80|CONCACAF Champions League
!width=80|MLS Cup Playoffs
!width=80|TOTAL
|-
|6||  || Hassoun Camara                   || DF || 2874 || 360 || 315 || 90 || 3639
|-
|5||  || Jeb Brovsky                      || DF || 2610 || 352 || 270 || 90 || 3322
|-
|13||  || Matteo Ferrari                  || DF || 2790 || 180 || 180 || 90 || 3240
|-
|9||  || Marco Di Vaio                    || FW || 2746 || 232 || 148 || 89 || 3215
|-
|1||  || Troy Perkins                     || GK || 2970 ||  ||  || 90 || 3060
|-
|8||  || Patrice Bernier                  || MF || 2474 || 360 || 99 ||  || 2933
|-
|21||  || Justin Mapp                     || MF || 2137 || 330 || 189 || 90 || 2746
|-
|7||  || Felipe || MF || 2350 || 116 || 152 || 28 || 2646
|-
|14||  || Alessandro Nesta                 || FW || 1939 || 90 || 180 ||  || 2209
|-
|15||  || Andrés Romero   || FW || 1672 || 264 || 171 || 34 || 2141
|-

Disciplinary record
Includes all competitive matches. The list is sorted by shirt number.

Italic: denotes no longer with club.

Recognition

MLS Player of the Week

MLS Team of the Week

MLS Coach of the Week

MLS Save of the Week

2013 MLS All-Star

Miscellany

Allocation ranking

International roster slots 
Montreal has eleven MLS International Roster Slots for use in the 2013 season. Each club in Major League Soccer is allocated eight international roster spots and Montreal acquired the extra slots in trades with Chivas USA, Seattle Sounders FC and Portland Timbers.

See also

References 

CF Montréal seasons
Montreal Impact
Montreal Impact
Montreal Impact